East Spencer is a town in Rowan County, North Carolina, United States. The population was 1,534 at the 2010 census.  Originally called "Southern City" because of significance of the railway to the area, it was incorporated in 1901 as East Spencer.  It was named for the Spencer shops that opened in the area in 1896.

Geography
East Spencer is located at  (35.682780, -80.431271).  East Spencer is adjacent to and south of the town of Spencer, North Carolina.  The Southern Railway tracks separate the two towns.

Government
The town of East Spencer is governed by a mayor and six board of alderman members.  The mayor serves a two-year term and the board members serve staggered four-year terms.  The board of alderman selects a town administrator, who conducts the business of the Town, supervise staff, manages finances, prepares meetings and assists the town as needed.

A post office was first established in East Spencer on February 12, 1919 with William J. Hatley as postmaster.

Demographics

2020 census

As of the 2020 United States census, there were 1,567 people, 527 households, and 287 families residing in the town.

2000 census
As of the census of 2000, there were 1,755 people, 697 households, and 450 families residing in the town. The population density was 1,115.3 people per square mile (431.6/km2). There were 796 housing units at an average density of 505.8 per square mile (195.8/km2). The racial makeup of the town was 11.79% White, 85.81% African American, 0.17% Native American, 0.06% Asian, 0.06% Pacific Islander, 0.91% from other races, and 1.20% from two or more races. Hispanic or Latino of any race were 2.74% of the population.

There were 697 households, out of which 35.2% had children under the age of 18 living with them, 25.1% were married couples living together, 34.1% had a female householder with no husband present, and 35.4% were non-families. 32.1% of all households were made up of individuals, and 12.8% had someone living alone who was 65 years of age or older. The average household size was 2.52 and the average family size was 3.18.

In the town, the population was spread out, with 33.8% under the age of 18, 8.7% from 18 to 24, 25.5% from 25 to 44, 20.2% from 45 to 64, and 11.7% who were 65 years of age or older. The median age was 30 years. For every 100 females, there were 80.0 males. For every 100 females age 18 and over, there were 73.8 males.

The median income for a household in the town was $18,947, and the median income for a family was $22,222. Males had a median income of $23,203 versus $21,801 for females. The per capita income for the town was $10,180. About 32.2% of families and 35.8% of the population were below the poverty line, including 47.4% of those under age 18 and 27.5% of those age 65 or over.

Schools
 East Spencer Negro School:  The East Spencer Negro School was established in East Spencer in 1900.  It was originally a one room school with a major expansion in 1921 to include an 11-classroom building with an auditorium, library, office lunchroom and basement.  In 1958, it was renamed Dunbar High School, named for the poet Paul Laurence Dunbar (1872-1906) from Kentucky.  The school was renamed North Rowan Middle School in the 1960s when it was integrated. In the 1990s, it ceased to become a school and was renamed the Paul Laurence Community Center.  It continued to be owned by the school system until 2006 when it was sold.  The building was destroyed by fire in 2015.
 Essie Mae Kiser Foxx Charter School:  This charter school was named for a prominent community leader in East Spencer.  It opened in August 2018 as a free, community-centric public school of choice with grades kindergarten through four and plans to add a grade each year until grades kindergarten through eighth grade are included.  The enrollment is 150 students.

Churches
The following religious organizations are located in East Spencer:
 East Spencer Baptist Church
 Faith Temple Triumphant Ministries, Inc.
 Long Street Methodist-Episcopal Church
 North Carolina-Virginia Primitive Baptist State Convention Worship and Conference Center
 Shady Grove Baptist Church
 Solid Rock Baptist Church
 Southern City AME Zion Church
 The Guiding Light Baptist Association
 Word of God Street Ministry

Notable people
Bobby Jackson (1973 ), NBA guard 
Carl Torbush, American football coach
Javon Hargrave, American football player
Essie Mae (Kiser) Foxx (1932-2016), East Spencer community leader

References

See also
 Spencer, North Carolina
 Samuel Spencer (railroad executive)

Towns in Rowan County, North Carolina
Towns in North Carolina